Sparky was a British comic published weekly by DC Thomson, that ran from (issue dates) 23 January 1965 to 9 July 1977 when it merged with The Topper after 652 issues. From 1965–1980 the comic published an annual entitled The Sparky Book. It was a DC Thomson comic, originally aimed at a slightly younger audience to The Beano and The Dandy later it was aimed at the same audience. It changed its name to The Sparky Comic in 1973.

List of comic strips
Strips which featured in Sparky at some point during the course of its 12-year run included. All numbers refer to issues of Sparky.

List of Sparky adventure Strips
As well as featuring comic strips Sparky featured adventure strips, though fewer and fewer of these appeared later in the comic's life.

See also
List of DC Thomson Publications

References

Smith, Alan The Sparky File, Comics UK, expanded from article in Crikey!

One of the appendixes of The Sparky File showing a list of strips that were in Sparky. Posted on the ComicsUK forum .

Comics magazines published in the United Kingdom
Defunct British comics
British humour comics
1965 comics debuts
1977 comics endings
Magazines established in 1965
Magazines disestablished in 1977
Weekly magazines published in the United Kingdom